Justice McHugh may refer to:

Michael McHugh (born 1935), justice of the High Court of Australia
Thomas McHugh (judge) (born 1936), justice of the Supreme Court of Appeals of West Virginia